Recale is a comune (municipality) in the Province of Caserta in the Italian region Campania, located about  north of Naples and about  southwest of Caserta.

Twin towns
 Bovino, Italy, since 2010

References

External links
 Official website

Cities and towns in Campania